Alison Rachel Fitch  (also known as Aly Fitch; born 18 February 1980 in Hamilton, New Zealand) is a New Zealand swimming competitor. She won a bronze medal in the 4 × 200 m freestyle relay at the 2006 Commonwealth Games.

Career
Fitch was one of the 14 swimmers who represented New Zealand at the 1996 Summer Olympics in Atlanta, United States. Fitch was in a team with Anna Wilson, Dionne Bainbridge, and Sarah Catherwood to compete in the 4 × 200 metre freestyle relay. They came fifth in their heat and did not qualify for the final; their overall placement was 11th out of 21 teams.

She also competed at 2004 Olympic Games.

Fitch won a bronze medal with Lauren Boyle, Helen Norfolk and Melissa Ingram in the 4 × 200 m freestyle relay at the 2006 Commonwealth Games.

In the 2008 New Year Honours, Fitch was appointed a Member of the New Zealand Order of Merit for services to swimming.

References

1980 births
Living people
New Zealand female swimmers
Olympic swimmers of New Zealand
Commonwealth Games bronze medallists for New Zealand
Swimmers at the 1996 Summer Olympics
Swimmers at the 2004 Summer Olympics
Swimmers at the 2006 Commonwealth Games
Sportspeople from Hamilton, New Zealand
Commonwealth Games medallists in swimming
Universiade medalists in swimming
Members of the New Zealand Order of Merit
Universiade silver medalists for New Zealand
New Zealand female freestyle swimmers
Medalists at the 2005 Summer Universiade
Medallists at the 2006 Commonwealth Games